Deir Qaq or Dayr Qaq is a village in al-Bab District in northern Aleppo Governorate, northwestern Syria.

The Syrian Army captured the village from ISIL on 9 February 2017.

References 

Populated places in al-Bab District